The 1856 United States House of Representatives election in Florida was held on Monday, October 6, 1856 to elect the single United States Representative from the state of Florida, one from the state's single at-large congressional district, to represent Florida in the 35th Congress. The election coincided with the elections of other offices, including the presidential election, the senatorial election, the gubernatorial election, and various state and local elections.

The winning candidate would serve a two-year term in the United States House of Representatives from March 4, 1857, to March 4, 1859.

Background

Florida's single seat in the House of Representatives had been held by the Democrats since 1852. In the 1854 election, the Democratic Party made key gains in the former Whig strongholds of Pensacola and Jacksonville. By 1856, the Whig Party had collapsed, and they were replaced in the South by the Know Nothing Party, also known as the American Party, which was serving as a successor to the prior Anti-Masonic Party.

Candidates

Democratic

Nominee 

 George Sydney Hawkins, federal judge for the Northern District of Florida and former associate justice of the Supreme Court of Florida

Withdrawn 

 Frederick L. Villepigue, secretary of state of Florida

Know Nothing

Nominee 

 James McNair Baker, state attorney for the Columbia County Circuit Court

Campaign 
Baker campaigned heavily alongside the Know Nothing candidates for president and governor, former President Millard Fillmore and former Tallahassee Mayor David S. Walker, respectively. However, Baker fell severely ill during the election and was not able to campaign properly for the last few months, instead relying on Walker to campaign for him. This put Baker, a political unknown, at a severe disadvantage to Hawkins, who was a popular judge throughout the state.

General election

Results

Results by County

See also
1856 United States presidential election in Florida
United States House of Representatives elections, 1856
1856 Florida gubernatorial election

References

1856
Florida
United States House of Representatives